is an aquarium in Uozu, Toyama Prefecture, Japan. Opened on the 21st of September 1913, it claims to be the oldest aquarium in Japan still open.

History
The aquarium was established as a venue for the 1913 Eight Prefectures Exhibition in what was then Uozu town of Shimoniikawa District, and was officially opened on the 21st of September, 1913, making it the first aquarium to open on the coast of the Sea of Japan. In May 1914 it would be sold to Uozu town. Due to the Pacific War, the aquarium closed in March 1944 to be used as a fish processing plant.

In 1914, a loss of power lead to the discovery that the Japanese pineapplefish contains luminescent bacteria on each side of its jaw.

In 1953, for the Toyama Industrial Exposition, the decision was made to re-establish an aquarium on the site. Despite opposition from the fishing industry in the area, and several other areas submitting bids to host the aquarium, construction on the original site began in September 1953 and was finished by April 1954.

The current aquarium was opened on the 10th of April, 1981. Also in 1981, the building, designed by the Uozu City Environmental Design Office, won an architectural award, presented by the Toyama Society of Architects and Building Engineers.

Shark Tunnel
Uozu Aquarium features the first shark tunnel to be built in Japan. It runs through the length of the Toyama Bay Giant Tank.

In 2013, in the 100th anniversary of an aquarium on the site, a sign was placed at the entrances to the tunnel proclaiming it as the first such acrylic glass aquarium tunnel in the world.

Exhibits
The Rivers of Toyama
Biodiversity in Rice Fields
Toyama Bay Deep Sea
Toyama Bay Surface Layer
Toyama Bay Giant Tank
Jungle Ecosystem
Coral Reef Area
Penguin Pool

Facilities
Uosui Famirium
Backstage Corner
Touch Pool

References

External Links
 Official Site (in English)
 Official Site (in Japanese)
 YouTube channel

Animal theme parks
Aquaria in Japan
Toyama Prefecture
1913 establishments in Japan